Parliamentary elections were held in Greece on Sunday, 14 November 1920, or 1 November 1920 old style. They were possibly the most crucial elections in the modern history of Greece, influencing not only the few years afterwards, including the Greek defeat by Kemal Atatürk's reformed Turkish Land Forces in 1922, but setting the stage for Greece's political landscape for most of the rest of the 20th century. It had been nearly five years since the last elections, a period during which all democratic procedures were suspended due to the National Schism, when Prime Minister Eleftherios Venizelos announced that elections would take place on 25 October. However, after the unexpected death of King Alexander, who had assumed the throne after the exile of his father, King Constantine I, the elections were postponed until 14 November.

Venizelos believed a victory for his Liberal Party was all but certain because of his diplomatic and military successes against the Ottoman Empire. However, the results were a disaster for him. Although his Liberal Party received just over 50% of the vote, it won only 118 of the 369 seats in the Hellenic Parliament, with the United Opposition – an alliance of the People's Party, Conservative Party, Reform Party and others – winning 251 of the 369 seats. Venizelos also failed to win a seat. Humiliated and disappointed by the outcome of the election, Venizelos left the country for France, also leaving his Liberal Party without an obvious successor.

Results
The Liberals' defeat was considered to have been caused by the electoral system, the opposition having a highly esteemed leader in Dimitrios Gounaris and managing to turn the elections into a referendum on the exiled King Constantine I, who was still popular especially in Old Greece. It was also thought that voters were tired after almost a decade of wars and division were tempted by the United Opposition promise to secure peace with the Turks and bring troops home.

References

Greece
Legislative election
1920s in Greek politics
Parliamentary elections in Greece
Greco-Turkish War (1919–1922)
Eleftherios Venizelos
History of Greece (1909–1924)
Greece
Legl